The 2005 Estonian Figure Skating Championships were held in Tallinn from December 10 to 12, 2004. Skaters competed in the disciplines of ladies' singles and pair skating.

Senior results

Ladies

Pairs
Olga Boguslavska / Andrei Brovenko of Latvia were guest competitors who finished 2nd.

Junior results
The 2005 Estonian Junior Figure Skating Championships took place in Tallinn from January 14 through 16, 2005.

Men

Ladies
13 participants

Pairs

Ice dancing

Synchronized

References

Figure Skating Championships
2004 in figure skating
Estonian Figure Skating Championships, 2005
Estonian Figure Skating Championships